The Men's giant slalom competition of the Innsbruck 1964 Olympics was held on 2 February at Axamer Lizum.

The defending world champion was Egon Zimmerman of Austria.

Results

References 

Men's giant slalom
Winter Olympics